Col. Czesław Mączyński (9 July 1881 in Kaszyce - 15 July 1935 in Lwów) was a Polish officer, politician in the Second Polish Republic, and the Commander-in-chief of the Polish military contingent during the defense of Lwów – also called the Battle of Lemberg – throughout November 1918 (part of the Polish–Ukrainian War), as well as the Polish–Soviet War of 1920. He was the recipient of some of the highest Polish military awards including Virtuti Militari, and a subject of the 2004 monograph by Jacek Miliński from University of Łódź.

Career
Mączyński graduated from high-school in Jarosław and studied at the University of Lemberg (now Lviv University, Ukraine). He worked as teacher of the Polish, Latin and Greek languages at the Gymnasium No.1 in Przemyśl under partitions. When the First World War erupted, he was drafted by the Austrians. He served in the Austro-Hungarian Army, reaching a rank of captain. Around 1918 he joined the nascent Polish Army fighting for independence, and in the Polish-Ukrainian War served in the battle of Lemberg (1918), where he organized the defense of the city, and was de facto in command. Later, he fought in the Polish-Soviet War, and reached the rank of colonel in the Polish Army.

Commander of Lwów

Mączyński, along with ppłk Michał Karaszewicz-Tokarzewski won the battle for Lwów, which lasted for three weeks, and has taken the lives of 439 Polish and 250 Ukrainian soldiers. They took over the city on the night of 21/22 November 1918.  On the morning of 22 November Mączyński issued a proclamation to all inhabitants of Lwów regardless of creed or religion assuring that they have nothing to fear and their rights will be respected by the new Polish administration providing they don't take up arms. However, at about 9am that same morning a pogrom erupted in the Jewish Quarter. Within hours Mączyński was visited by the President of the Jewish Religious Community Emil Parnas with Emil Wasser requesting protection; also addressed by them, were Ernest Adam from Polski Komitet Obywatelski and President Władysław Stesłowicz. General Roja issued an order convening of courts martial in deserving cases, but Mączyński did not receive it until two days later, which was blamed on the office-shop mishap.

On Saturday, 23 November, Brigadier General  Bolesław Roja nominated Mączyński as the Commander of Lwów and its County, and transferred his military duties to Karaszewicz-Tokarzewski. Meanwhile, the pogrom continued throughout Saturday. Wiktor Chajes, Emil Parnas and Emil Wasser pleaded also with Roja and received his promise of protection. The assailants set on fire a few Jewish houses on the north side of Krakowski Square and the nearby streets. The Zipper's jewelry store in the square was ransacked, along with Gabriel Starck at Akademicki Square, Stauber's on Mariacki Square and the Jewish stores along ul. Karola Ludwika including the Abbazia café and the New York café, not to mention the actual Jewish Quarter where stores were robbed as a matter of course. Roja declared martial law. Soldiers were prohibited from leaving the barracks. Patrols were sent out and ordered to disarm any soldier without a unit. Roja confiscated an appeal to the Jewish community written by Mączyński, because he mentioned in it instances of Jewish attacks on Polish servicemen reported to him, including shooting from concealment and throwing of axes. The riots were extinguished by General Roja on 24 November 1918.

According to historian Carole Fink, Mączyński delayed the implementation of a 22 November order for martial law from Brigadier General Bolesław Roja for a day and a half.  In the interim, Mączyński issued inflammatory proclamations, using what has been described as "medieval terminology," of supposed acts of Jewish treachery against Polish troops.  He claimed, for example, that Jews had attacked Poles with axes. The Jewish quarter was cordoned off for 48 hours by fire officials, and buildings in the quarter, including 3 synagogues, were allowed to burn. The killing and burning in the quarter had already been done by the time Mączyński allowed patrols to enter the area.

The report written by Colonel Czesław Mączyński afterwards attempted to summarize the terrible human losses from his perspective as Commander of Lwów.

Official investigation
Soon after the pogrom, a special state commission arrived from Warsaw in order to investigate, including Leon Chrzanowski and Józef Wasserzug. Their initial assessment was not entirely researched and suggested over 150 victims. Death count was later adjusted to include 73 persons killed of whom the youngest was only 11 years old, and the oldest, 80. There were 372 Jews seriously wounded, and over 50 homes burned including the Old Synagogue at Bożnicza Street and the Hasidic Synagogue at the corner of pl. św. Teodora and ul. Węglana. At least 3,729 homes, stores and workshops were robbed. Subsequently, some 1,600 persons were arrested, suspected of participating in the pogrom. The majority of them were released soon thereafter. In mid February 1919 charges were laid against 79 suspects, including 46 women and 8 army soldiers. Convicted of crime were 44 individuals, sentenced from 10 days to 18 months in prison. Three participants were sentenced to death for capital offences, and executed. According to internal investigation by the Jewish Rescue Committee (Żydowski Komitet Ratunkowy) held alongside the official state investigation, most rapes, robberies and murders were committed by unidentified soldiers.

Postwar career
After the war, Mączyński settled near Brzeżany and became a social activist. In 1922 he was elected as Deputy to the first Polish parliament (Sejm) as member of the right-wing Christian Union of National Unity coalition from Lwów. He returned to the Army in 1927 at the age of 46 but retired two years later in 1929, and in 1933 was awarded the Cross of Independence with Swords for his service during the Polish–Soviet War. He also published his memoirs and analysis of the battle of Lwów, titled  Boje Lwowskie, with description of the anti-Jewish "Lwów pogrom". Mączyński remained single. Known to local nationalists, he was a target of notable arsons. He died of an illness at the age of 54. His place in the Polish history of Lviv was reasserted only after the collapse of the Soviet Union.

Honours and awards
 Silver Cross of the Order of Virtuti Militari
 Cross of Independence with Swords
 Officer's Cross of the Order of Polonia Restituta
 Cross of Valour - four times

See also
 Lwów pogrom (1918)

Notes 

a.  Original text in Polish of an Appeal to the Jews of Lemberg signed by Mączyński, and confiscated by General Roja right thereafter. The Appeal spoke of the reported to him (not properly investigated) individual cases of alleged Jewish attacks (which were later disproved as false in official state investigation) and ascribed responsibility for these acts upon the Jewish community.

References

 Czesław Mączyński. Biography. Fundacja Edukacyjna „Perspektywy”, I Liceum Ogólnokształcące im. Juliusza Słowackiego w Przemyślu.

Further reading
 Stefan Mękarski, Czesław Mączyński (in Obrona Lwowa t.II, Warszawa 1993)

1881 births
1935 deaths
Austro-Hungarian Army officers
Polish Army officers
Recipients of the Silver Cross of the Virtuti Militari
Officers of the Order of Polonia Restituta
Recipients of the Cross of Independence with Swords
Recipients of the Cross of Valour (Poland)